"All My Love" is a song by French musical artist and record producer Watermät, British singer Becky Hill and Tai, released as a digital download on 13 August 2015 through Polydor and Spinnin' Records. It peaked at number 115 on the UK Singles Chart. The song was written by Laurent Arriau, Rebecca Claire Hill, Karen Poole, Tai Jason and Mark Ralph.

Music video
A music video to accompany the release of "All My Love" was first released onto YouTube on 13 August 2015 at a total length of two minutes and forty-one seconds.

Charts

Release history

References

2015 singles
2015 songs
Becky Hill songs
Songs written by Becky Hill
Songs written by Karen Poole
Songs written by Mark Ralph (record producer)
Song recordings produced by Mark Ralph (record producer)